César Fernández García (born on 22 April 1967) is a Spanish novelist. His novels and short stories have been distributed in several countries and have been translated into many languages, including Turkish language and Korean language.

Personal life

César Fernández García was born on 22 April 1967 in Madrid, Spain. He is an author who has written about everything from poetry to mystery novels, including children's literature, young adult fiction and articles. His body of work, which consists of more than thirty titles,
 has been awarded several prizes.
He studied Philology in the Complutense University of Madrid, he has taught Literature at several universities and he has participated in meetings about the joy and adventure of reading and writing at Libraries and High Schools. He also writes articles about creative writing in literary reviews. He is outspoken about subjects such as the importance of always looking at the positive side of life.

His more successful works are No digas que estás solo (Honor Roll 2010 CCEI Award), Ellos (winner of the 2009 Jaén Prize for Young Adult Novel) and La última bruja de Trasmoz (2009 La Galera Literary Prize for Young Adult Fiction).

Style

César Fernández García's fictions are often focused on one strongly defined character. He has used important authors as characters, such as Gustavo Adolfo Bécquer who is the main character in La última bruja de Trasmoz.

The majority of action usually takes place on islands. Ellos  is set on Formentera. El hijo del ladrón is set on Tenerife; El rugido de la vida, on La Palma;  Las sirenas del alma, on La Gomera; El desafío de la leyenda, on El Hierro...

As readers, we don't find explicit didacticism or moralist allegory in his fictions. César Fernández García believes that meaning in literature should be an undercurrent just beneath the surface.

His works – belonging to several literary genres - mix mystery, tenderness, horror, reality, love and adventure. He has written fantasy novels such as El bibliobús mágico and El rugido de la vida. Mystery novels such as Bárbara y el misterio de Ariadna, La visita del vampiro, Los extraños vecinos del bajo B and Donde vive el miedo. Horror novels such as El e-mail del mal. Children's literature such as No, no y no and Un hogar para Dog. Psychological novels such as La magia del samurái. Social novels such as La camiseta de Óscar.  Adventure novels such as El desafío de la leyenda and El hijo del ladrón.

His literary corpus reflects an attempt to sculpt the deflected reality in order to find a meaning of life. Sometimes a subplot becomes the primary focus of the novel little by little. The intrigue and the reflections on human nature are ubiquitous in his fictions. Therefore, La última bruja de Trasmoz reflects about the immortality of the human actions. Ellos raises disturbing questions about what makes us human beings. The survival of the Past, seen as a prelude to the Present, is the main point that builds No digas que estás solo and Las sirenas del alma.

Bibliography 

 El bibliobús mágico - Publisher: Brief, 2001.  
 Bárbara, detective - Publisher: Eiunsa, 2002.  
 Bárbara y el misterio de Ariadna - Publisher: Bruño, 2002. 
 Los extraños vecinos del bajo B - Publisher: Bruño, 2003. 
 La visita del vampiro - Publisher: Siruela, 2004. 
 Ordenadores con bandera pirata - Publisher: Bruño, 2005. 
 La magia del samurái - Publisher: Bruño, 2006. 
 No, no y no (Honor Roll 2007CCEI Award) - Publisher: Bambú, 2006.  
 La camiseta de Óscar - Publisher: Bambú, 2006. 
 Donde vive el miedo - Publisher: Bruño, 2007. 
 El e-mail del mal (Finalist of the 2007 Jaén Prize for Young Adult Novel) - Publisher:  Alfaguara, 2007. 
 Un hogar para Dog - Publisher: Bambú, 2007. 
 El rugido de la vida (Finalist of the 2007 Edebé literary prize for young adult fiction) - Publisher: Edebé, 2007. 
 La oreja de Pompón - Publisher: Bruño, 2008. 
 Cuatro misterios para Bárbara detective - Publisher: Palabra, 2008. 
 No digas que estás solo (Honor Roll 2010 CCEI Award) - Publisher: Bruño, 2009. 
 Un misterio en mi colegio - Publisher: Homolegens, 2009. 
 Las sirenas del alma - Publisher:  Algar, 2009. 
 La última bruja de Trasmoz (La Galera Award 2009) - Publisher:  La Galera, 2009. 
 Ellos (winner of the 2009 Jaén Prize for Young Adult Novel) - Publisher:  Montena, 2009. 
  El desafío de la leyenda - Publisher: Brief, 2010. 
  El hijo del ladrón - Publisher: Bruño, 2010 
 Sácame de aquí - Publisher: San Pablo, 2011. 
 La isla de la televisión - Publisher: Palabra, 2012. 
 16 olímpicos muy, muy importantes - Editorial Bruño, colección Saber Más, 2012.
 Héctor y el colegio embrujado - Editorial Kattigara, colección Fierabrás (Serie Grumetes), 2012. 
 16 dioses y héroes mitológicos muy, muy importantes - Editorial Bruño, colección Saber Más, 2012.
 El mensaje del mal - Editorial Algar, colección Algar Joven, 2012. 
 La niebla que te envuelve - Editorial Bruño, colección Paralelo Cero, 2013. 
 Bajo control - Editorial Algar, 2014. 
 El color de lo invisible - Publisher: Palabra, 2014. 
 Los Turboskaters: La leyenda del robot asesino - Editorial Bruño, 2021. Written with Casandra Balbás and Bárbara Balbás. 
 Los Turboskaters: La leyenda del cementerio de Nigrum - Editorial Bruño, 2021. Written with Casandra Balbás and Bárbara Balbás. 
 Los Turboskaters: La leyenda del videojuego Ferno 666 - Editorial Bruño, 2022. Written with Casandra Balbás and Bárbara Balbás.

References

External links
 Official Website (in Spanish)

 Interview with César Fernández García at Europa Press
 César Fernández García at Publisher Alfaguara
 César Fernández García´s Biography
 Videos about César Fernández García´s novels
  Video at Instituto Cervantes
 Minisite at Random House Mondadori
 César Fernández García earned the 2009 La Galera Literary Prize for Young Adult Fiction
 Interview at Spanish National Radio

1967 births
Living people
Writers from Madrid
Spanish novelists
Spanish male novelists
Spanish children's writers
Complutense University of Madrid alumni
Spanish mystery writers